Most, Most, Most, Most is a 1966 animated film by Soyuzmultfilm directed by Vasily Livanov.

Plot
This legend was told by the Ancient Spirit, who hid himself at the bottom of a dried-up well in the very middle of Africa. On the shores of Lake Chad many different birds and animals have settled. Once upon a time they decided to elect a king and chose Lion. They called him the bravest, the strongest, the wisest and the most beautiful. Then a son was born to the Leo and the Lioness - Little Lion. When the Little Lion became able to walk alone, he met a hyena who told Little Lion that he is a Lion, hence the king of beasts, which means he was the bravest, the strongest, the wisest, the most beautiful.

Little Lion matured, began to move farther from home and came across a well with the Ancient Spirit. Little Lion boasted that he was the bravest, the strongest, the wisest, the most beautiful! The Ancient Spirit laughed and said: "You are the most stupid!" Then Little Lion was bitten by an ant who was not afraid of anyone, because he defended his anthill. Little Lion said: "You are indeed more brave than me, but I am the strongest!" The Ant laughed, called Little Lion the most stupid and advised him to find the Bald Elephant.

And the Little Lion went to look for the Bald Elephant. And when he saw how a huge elephant easily rips out a tree by the root, he realized who is the strongest! The eagle said: "Listen and remember! Do not say that you are brave - you will meet someone braver! Do not say that you are strong - you will meet a stronger one! Do not say that you are wise - you will meet someone more wise!" "I understand, – answered the Little Lion, – But who is the most beautiful? "The eagle flew away without listening.

Some time has passed, the young Lion called the beasts and birds using his roar, and announced that he would tear apart those who would call him the bravest, the strongest, the wisest and the most beautiful. Lion was approached by the young Lioness who said: "I fell in love with you at first sight. You can tear me apart, but I'll still say it! You are the most beautiful!" The lion smiled at her with a shy smile, because he realized that the one who is loved, is always the most, most, most, most ...

Cast
Rina Zelyonaya - Little Lion
Valentina Sperantova - Adolescent Lion
Ivan Tarkhanov - Young Lion
Elena Ponsova - Hyena
Vladimir Koretsky - The Ancient Spirit
Klara Rumyanova - The Crocodile / The Ant
Vladimir Balashov - Eagle
Valentina Tumanova - Dove
Lyubov Zemlyanikina - Lioness
Alexander Baranov - Little Lion's Father
Vasily Livanov - The Crocodile

References

1966 animated films
1966 films
Films scored by Gennady Gladkov
Russian animated films
1960s Russian-language films
Soviet animated films

Soyuzmultfilm